The collared laughingthrush (Trochalopteron yersini) is a species of bird in the family Leiothrichidae.
It is endemic to Vietnam.

Its natural habitats are subtropical or tropical moist montane forests and subtropical or tropical high-altitude shrubland.
It is threatened by habitat loss.

References

 BirdLife International 2004.  Garrulax yersini.   2006 IUCN Red List of Threatened Species.   Downloaded on 25 July 2007.

Trochalopteron
Endemic birds of Vietnam
Endangered animals
Endangered biota of Asia
Birds described in 1919
Taxonomy articles created by Polbot